The Second Federal Electoral District of Yucatán (II Distrito Electoral Federal de Yucatán)
is one of the 300 Electoral Districts into which Mexico is divided for the purpose of elections to the federal Chamber of Deputies and one of five such districts in the state of Yucatán.

It elects one deputy to the lower house of Congress for each three-year legislative period, by means of the first past the post system.

District territory
Under the 2005 districting scheme, the district covers the northern municipalities of Yucatán.

The district's head town (cabecera distrital), where results from individual polling stations are gathered together and collated, is the city of Progreso.

Previous districting schemes

1996–2005 district
Between 1996 and 2005, Yucatán's Second District covered the north-west portion of the state.

Deputies returned to Congress from this district

L Legislature
 1976–1979: Rubén Calderón Cecilio (PRI)
LI Legislature
 1979–1982: Gonzalo Navarro Báez (PRI)
LII Legislature
 1982–1985: José Pacheco Durán (PRI)
LIII Legislature
 1985–1988:
LIV Legislature
 1988–1991:
LV Legislature
 1991–1994:
LVI Legislature
 1994–1997: Rubén Calderón Cecilio (PRI)
LVII Legislature
 1997–2000:
LVIII Legislature
 2000–2003: José Feliciano Moo y Can (PRI)
LIX Legislature
 2003–2006: Ivonne Ortega Pacheco (PRI)
LX Legislature
 2006–2009: José Luis Blanco Pajón (PRI)

References and notes

Federal electoral districts of Mexico
Geography of Yucatán